Arthur Chauncey "Rats" Henderson (August 29, 1896 – September 8, 1988) was an American baseball pitcher in the Negro leagues. He played with the Lincoln Giants and Richmond Giants in 1922, the Bacharach Giants from 1923 to 1929 and the St. Louis Stars and Detroit Stars in 1931.

At age 55, Henderson received votes listing him on the 1952 Pittsburgh Courier player-voted poll of the Negro leagues' best players ever.

References

External links
 and Baseball-Reference Black Baseball stats and Seamheads
Negro League Baseball Players Association

1896 births
1988 deaths
Bacharach Giants players
Detroit Stars players
Lincoln Giants players
Richmond Giants players
St. Louis Stars (baseball) players
Baseball players from Virginia
People from Henrico County, Virginia
20th-century African-American sportspeople
Baseball pitchers